Aconodes piniphilus is a species of beetle in the family Cerambycidae. It was described by Holzschuh in 2003. It is known from Bhutan.

References

Aconodes
Beetles described in 2003